Daybreak is an American post-apocalyptic comedy-drama television series created by Brad Peyton and Aron Eli Coleite, based on the comic series by Brian Ralph. It premiered on October 24, 2019, on Netflix and stars Colin Ford, Alyvia Alyn Lind, Sophie Simnett, Austin Crute, Cody Kearsley, Jeanté Godlock, Gregory Kasyan, Krysta Rodriguez, and Matthew Broderick.

In December 2019, Netflix canceled the series after one season.

Synopsis
The series follows the story of 17-year-old Canadian high school outcast Josh Wheeler, who is searching for his missing British girlfriend Sam Dean in post-apocalyptic Glendale, California. He is joined by a ragtag group of misfits, including 10-year-old pyromaniac Angelica and Josh's former high school bully Wesley, who is now a pacifist would-be samurai. Josh tries to survive among the hordes of Mad Max-style gangs (evil jocks, cheerleaders turned Amazonian warriors, etc), people who have turned into zombie-like creatures called Ghoulies, and the mysterious Baron Triumph.

The leader of the jocks, Turbo, doesn't make things better; as his terrible leadership and sadism culls the remaining survivors.

Cast

Main
 Colin Ford as Josh Wheeler, a recent transfer student searching for his girlfriend in the apocalypse. He is Fourth wall aware, and not narrating out craziness.
 Alyvia Alyn Lind as Angelica Green, a 10-year-old pyromaniac
 Sophie Simnett as Samaira "Sam" Dean, a popular student and Josh's girlfriend
 Austin Crute as Wesley Fists, a self-styled rōnin seeking redemption for his past mistakes
 Cody Kearsley as Turbo "Bro Jock" Pokaski, former quarterback and the unhinged leader of the Jocks
 Jeanté Godlock as Mona Lisa, a Jock and Turbo's second-in-command
 Gregory Kasyan as Eli Cardashyan, a resilient and self-serving Armenian American survivor who occupies the Glendale Mall
 Krysta Rodriguez as Ms. Crumble, Glendale High's former biology teacher
 Matthew Broderick as Michael Francis Xavier Burr, Glendale High's principal. It's unknown how accurate Josh's flashbacks are, but Burr appears to be "odd" as he goes in nonsensical ramblings before getting to the point.

Recurring

The Jocks
 Chester Rushing as Terrence "Terry" Markazian, captain of the golf team
 Micah McNeil as Jerry
 Alan Trong as Larry
 Mickey Dolan as Gary Stern
 Jon Levert as Barry
 Luke Valen as #54

The Daybreakers
A.J. Voliton as Fred
Abigail Townsend as Vivienne
 Chelsea Zhang as Karen Jane "KJ", a polyglot and Josh's ally
 Estrella Avila as Jessica Huntley
 Kevin Bransford as Other Gay Josh
 Jack Justice as Jew-Fro Simon
 Bao Winn as Rocco

The Cheermazons
 Jade Payton as Demi Anderson, one of the three leaders of the Cheermazons
 Sandra Mae Frank as Victoria, one of the three leaders of the Cheermazons
 Emily Snell as Miryam, one of the three leaders of the Cheermazons
 Charlotte Benesch as Camilla, a Brazilian exchange student
 Barbie Robertson as Veronica, Victoria's closest friend and interpreter

Other survivors
 Sammi Hanratty as Aria Killigan: the reclusive leader of the Gamers, and ally of KJ
 Rob H. Roy as Jaden Hoyles
 Erik Christensen as Jaden Thompson Magee
 Gabriel Armijo as Jaden Unger
 Austin Maas as Bro Jock
 Zoe Biggers as Jaden Florentina
 Andrew Fox as Owen 'Slowen' Krieger
 Natalie Alyn Lind as Mavis
 Mitchell Hoog as Nimrod
 Meg Smith as Isis Goodman
 Jordyn Aurora Aquino as a disciple of Kardashia

Episodes

Production

Development
Peyton started creating a series based on the graphic novel in 2012. He realised that the book had influences from Ferris Bueller. On July 26, 2018, Netflix announced an order for the production of a ten-episode first season. Aron Eli Coleite was set to serve as showrunner for the series. The series is created by Brad Peyton and Coleite who are credited as executive producers alongside Jeff Fierson. ASAP Entertainment will be involved in the production of the series. In September 2019, it was reported that the series was set to premiere on October 24, 2019. On December 16, 2019, Netflix canceled the series after one season.

Casting
In October 2018, it was announced that Matthew Broderick would star in the series. In the same month, it was reported that Colin Ford, Alyvia Alyn Lind, Sophie Simnett, Austin Crute, Gregory Kasyan, Krysta Rodriguez, Cody Kearsley, and Jeante Godlock joined the cast.

Filming 
Principal photography for the first season took place on location in Albuquerque, New Mexico, from October 2018 to April 2019.

Release

On September 16, 2019, a teaser trailer for the series was released. On October 7, 2019, Netflix released the official trailer for the series.

Reception
The review aggregator website Rotten Tomatoes reported a 70% approval rating for the first season with an average rating of 7.0/10, based on 33 reviews. The website's critical consensus reads, "Daybreak blend of soapy teen drama and post apocalyptic horror has some truly inspired moments, even if it feels like you've seen a few of them before." On Metacritic, it has a weighted average score of 54 out of 100, based on 10 critics, indicating "mixed or average reviews".

References

External links 
 
 

2010s American black comedy television series
2010s American comedy-drama television series
2010s American drama television series
2010s American high school television series
2010s American teen drama television series
2019 American television series debuts
2019 American television series endings
American teen comedy-drama web series
Apocalyptic television series
English-language Netflix original programming
Post-apocalyptic television series
Post-apocalyptic web series
Serial drama television series
Television shows adapted into comics
Television shows based on comics
Television series about teenagers
Television shows filmed in New Mexico
Television shows set in Los Angeles
Television shows set in the United States